The Bren Z. Guiao Sports Complex and Convention Center is a sports complex located in San Fernando, Pampanga, Philippines. It is one of the home venues of the Pampanga Giant Lanterns that plays in the Maharlika Pilipinas Basketball League.

Facilities

It is a multi-purpose complex which has facilities used for concerts, convention, basketball games, beauty pageants and other sport activities. It hosts a 3,000-seat, air-conditioned convention center. The sports complex also has a stadium which has a single grandstand.

Notable events

References

Basketball venues in the Philippines
Indoor arenas in the Philippines
Volleyball venues in the Philippines
Sports complexes in the Philippines